Segregation in concrete is a case of particle segregation in concrete applications, in which particulate solids tend to segregate by virtue of differences in the size, density, shape and other properties of particles of which they are composed.

Definition
It is described by American Society for Testing and Materials as follows: "Segregation in concrete is commonly thought of as separation of some size groups of aggregates from cement mortar in isolated locations with corresponding deficiencies of these materials in other locations. Segregation results in proportions of the laid concrete being in variation with those designed. Segregation could result from internal factors such as concrete that is not proportioned properly and not mixed adequately, or too workable a mix. It also could result from external factors such as too much vibration, improper transportation, placement, or adverse weather conditions. The corresponding increase in proportion of cement paste in upper areas would tend to make them susceptible to increased shrinkage and formation of cracks. These cracks could be 10 µm to 500 µm wide, formed perpendicular to the surface, and be in the form of map patterns."

The concrete should be free from segregation. It is defined as the breaking up of cohesion (separation of concrete aggregate) in a mass of concrete. It results in honey-combing, decrease in density, and ultimately loss of strength of hardened concrete. The effect of aggregate segregation on the mechanical and transport behavior of concrete has been the focus of both modeling as well as experimental investigation.

See also
 Properties of concrete

Notes

References

Further reading
  
 Towards a realistic morphological model for the meso-scale mechanical and transport behavior of cementitious composites Davood Niknezhad; Balaji Raghavan; Fabrice Bernard; Siham Kamali-Bernard; Composites Part A: Engineering, Volume 381, 72-83, 2015 Elsevier

External links
 Segregation in concrete - from Civil Experiences
 Lecture 12: Module 5 Lecture - 4 Fresh Concrete : Segregation & Bleeding from the Indian Institute of Technology, Delhi

Concrete